Tittling is a municipality  in the district of Passau in Bavaria in Germany.

It is home to the Bavarian Forest Museum Village.

References

Passau (district)